Weird TV, or Weird Television, was a programme that aired in 1991 on Canadian late-night TV, as well as American stations such as KCOP, Channel 13 in Los Angeles; KTZZ (now KZJO), Channel 22 in Seattle, and Columbus, Ga. NBC affiliate WLTZ, Channel 38.

Premise
The "host" of the show was Chuck Cirino, who was also one of the show's executive producers along with Todd Stevens (who also produced the hit show Friends) and Arthur Maturo.

Cirino was the one constant of every show. He pops up in his landcruiser for a few seconds, setting up new segments of the show in his own eccentric way. He is known as the "comfort zone" of the show, as the subtitles during these segments tell you.

Also included in the program were clips Cirino had filmed from the Burning Man festival.

Segments include:
Weird America, a segment of the show in which the crew flies out to unusual events all across the country. For example, "Car Hunt", where a full-sized, remote-controlled car is let loose in the Nevada desert and is hunted down with high-powered weapons, "just like big game", according to Cirino.
Shadoevision, a continuing science-fiction thriller hosted by Shadoe Stevens.
The Dr. Ruehl show, where noted "phenomenologist" Dr. Franklin Ruehl talks about viewers of the latest cases of strange phenomena.
Video Dave's UFO Clip of the Week, where Dave Aaron reports on the latest extraterrestrial sightings from around the world.
Newsweird, which features strange news from around the globe.
Weird music videos, such as those for Monster Magnet's Negasonic Teenage Warhead and Skunk Anansie's Selling Jesus.

Another segment of the show includes stand-alone video pieces that are produced specifically for the show, as well as other video pieces sent in by viewers themselves.

These include:
 Zatar the Mutant King, played by David Floyd. Zatar wears a dark cloak and a pair of heavy goggles. He carries "his sugar" with him at all times. Because his mother consumed too much sugar during her pregnancy, he was born with the power to mutate at will, defeating his enemies by becoming his enemies.
 Trash: Francis & Buzz – Two deformed hand puppets converse.
 Weird Love – A man discovers that his girlfriend is a were–caterpillar
 Mobius in the world of the Living Dead
 Babe in a Bottle(subtitled) – A tiny woman and a doctor.
 Limbo Lounge - Sammy Davis Jr., Sulu and a transvestite perform a night club act.
 Hog Man's Pork n' Bean Emporium – A strange man sells pork n' beans from a drive-up window.

Controversy
The show was banned in Philadelphia and Wisconsin for broadcasting a stop-motion animated short about a squirrel defecating massively.

Awards
The shows (now defunct) website www.weird.tv was nominated for 3 Webby Awards in 2006, under the categories of Best Humor, Best Use of Animation or Graphics and Best Weird.

References

External links 
 Newer site with links to DVDs and information about the show
  Article about Weird TV with quotes from Chuck Cirino and Arthur Maturo 

1990s Canadian documentary television series
First-run syndicated television shows in Canada
1994 Canadian television series debuts
1996 Canadian television series endings